United Airlines Limited, also known as United Airlines Uganda, was a private airline in Uganda. The airline provided scheduled passenger services as well as air charters from its base at Entebbe International Airport, to several airports within Uganda, as illustrated in the table below. Incorporated in 1997, it has since ceased operations.

Destinations
The airline maintained scheduled and shuttle services to the following destinations:
 

The airline went out of business.

See also
 List of airlines of Uganda
 Entebbe International Airport

References

External links
 United Airlines Limited Information Portal

Defunct airlines of Uganda